Charity Creek, a northern tributary of the Parramatta River, is a creek west of Sydney Harbour, located in Sydney, New South Wales, Australia. It joins the Parramatta River at Meadowbank Park, Meadowbank.

Ecology
The source of the creek is in the suburb of West Ryde.

The catchment is bounded by Victoria Road, Devlin Street, Blaxland Road, Marlow Avenue and the Main Northern railway line. The catchment boundary crosses the railway line just south of West Ryde railway station. The catchment is predominantly residential with some commercial development in the vicinity of Rhodes Street and Herbert Street. Most of the drainage system in the Charity Creek catchment consists of concrete pipes or boxed culverts. The creek is culverted down to Meadowbank Boys High School. Below this is a short reach of natural open channel to the railway line.  Downstream of the railway line the creek is a concrete lined channel. All the tributaries of Charity Creek are piped.

Charity Creek Cascades, named after the creek, is an interconnected series of council parks running from Top Ryde to West Ryde railway station.

History
Charity Point, near Charity Creek, is attributed to William Bennet, an early settler who was both a farmer and South Sea trader. When his ships need repairing, a large number of south-sea islander crew camped on the shore. His kind treatment to them earned the names Charity Creek and Charity Headland.

Dinner Point, now called Charity Point, at the Meadowbank Memorial Park, is said to have acquired its name on 15 February 1788.  First Lieutenant William Bradley wrote: 
At 1pm returned to the Boats and after dinner went in the smallest boat over the flats past a mangrove island.
Bradley then followed a creek so narrow that boat oars stuck their struck the sides until they were stopped by fallen trees.  Charity Point, once backed by a creek which has been filled in, was originally named Mur-ray-mah, perhaps meaning 'black bream', heard by the linguist Lieutenant William Dawes as karóoma (garuma).  Charity Point was also a popular fishing spot.  Kent, a nephew of Governor John Hunter, was first granted  on 12 May 1796.  He received a further grant in 1803, when his nephew William Kent Jnr obtained  in the district of Eastern Farms.  It was after the 1840s that the former orchards and farms of the Ryde area began to be subdivided and Charity Creek was filled in.

See also
 Smalls Creek, Meadowbank
 Archer Creek, Meadowbank

References

Creeks and canals of Sydney